Manuel Esmoris (born 11 July 1907, date of death unknown) was an Uruguayan boxer who competed in the 1924 Summer Olympics. In 1924 he was eliminated in the second round of the featherweight class after losing his fight to Marcel Depont.

References

External links
profile

1907 births
Featherweight boxers
Olympic boxers of Uruguay
Boxers at the 1924 Summer Olympics
Year of death missing
Uruguayan male boxers